S111 is a Dutch road in Amsterdam. S111 is roughly 4 miles (6.4 kilometers) and is connected to S112. The S111 connects the Julianaplein (in front of the Amstel station) and the S112 with the A10, Villa Arena ( a shopping center) in the Bijlmermeer and the A9. Next, the road makes a loop past the Academic Medical Center, and once again connects to the A9. The road is sequentially called Julianaplein, Overzichtweg, Spaklerweg, Holterbergweg, Muntbergweg and Meibergdreef.

See also

Notes

 Map

City routes in Amsterdam